Las Vegas Boulevard is a major road in Clark County, Nevada, United States, best known for the Las Vegas Strip portion of the road and its casinos. Formerly carrying U.S. Route 91 (US 91), which had been the main highway between Los Angeles, California and Salt Lake City, Utah, it has been bypassed by Interstate 15 and serves mainly local traffic with some sections designated State Route 604.

Route description
Las Vegas Boulevard runs the length of the Las Vegas metropolitan area in Clark County. The Boulevard shows up again in Primm, but is currently not connected to the northern sections. There are tentative plans to connect the existing section at Primm to the northern section at Jean.

Las Vegas Boulevard serves as the Valley's east/west address demarcation boundary line south of the Strat onwards. The road's own north/south street address demarcation boundary is located at its intersection with Fremont Street. Unlike most other cases, where using the more traditional nomenclature of putting the direction before the road name is common practice, The Boulevard is an exception, as it is rarely referred to as "North Las Vegas Boulevard" and "South Las Vegas Boulevard".  The road instead is usually referred to as "Las Vegas Boulevard North" (abbreviated LVBN) and "Las Vegas Boulevard South" (stylized LVBS), by both residents and various media outlets.

At its northern end, the Boulevard starts at the south end of Moapa Paulite Solar Road. Running north of, but roughly parallel with I-15, it heads southwest toward Las Vegas, passing through an industrial complex of manufacturing plants and power plants running along the Union Pacific Railroad line in Apex. Traveling south, the road meets Nellis Air Force Base on the east side and the Las Vegas Motor Speedway on the west side.

As the road enters the city of North Las Vegas, it passes through some of the older commercial areas in the region.  As the road approaches the city of Las Vegas proper, some of what historical Las Vegas became visible, as some of the older casinos appear along with some of the more famous and long-operating strip clubs.

Upon entering the city limits of Las Vegas, the Boulevard showcases the area's past with many museums, including the Old Las Vegas Mormon Fort State Historic Park, the Neon Museum, and the Fremont Street Experience and downtown casino sector.  On crossing Washington Avenue, the Boulevard is designated as the Downtown Las Vegas Boulevard Scenic Byway by the state.  This designation continues south to Sahara Avenue.

Further south is a stretch of road that has many of the older motels, bars and wedding chapels that were among the high points of the old Vegas before the era of the megaresorts.

Las Vegas Strip

The Boulevard leaves the city of Las Vegas at Sahara Avenue and assumes its unofficial name the Las Vegas Strip for the next . This portion of Las Vegas Boulevard begins a few blocks to the north at the Stratosphere (the only major Strip hotel/casino sited within the Las Vegas city limits) and runs through Winchester and Paradise, with the Strip technically ending at Russell Road. This is the section of the road most people are familiar with; it is home to casino megaresorts with their world-famous lights, huge video signs, and other attractions. It is designated as an All-American Road. Just past the end of "The Strip", the road passes the Welcome to Fabulous Las Vegas sign (located in the median) as it abuts the western edge of the Harry Reid International Airport property. The sign is often considered the south end of the Strip.

"South Strip" is now used to describe the section of Las Vegas Boulevard between Russell Road and Blue Diamond Road. Along this stretch, development thins out, except for newer shopping malls, hotels, resorts, casinos and condominiums (such as South Point Hotel & Casino and The Grandview at Las Vegas) as the Boulevard continues to travel south, just to the east of Interstate 15. 

After passing the M Resort, the Boulevard enters rural desert areas. It continues to parallel Interstate 15 and eventually arrives at Jean. South of Jean, the road ceases to be a major artery for a stretch of several miles before resuming just north of Primm, where it runs alongside two of the resort's hotels and shopping mall; just short of the Nevada/California state line, the road changes its name to Lotto Store Road and becomes a local road.

Public transportation
RTC Transit Route(s) 113 (and the MAX, before February 2016, when it was decommissioned) serves the road from Downtown Las Vegas north to Nellis Air Force Base, The Deuce serves the Road from Downtown Las Vegas south to Warm Springs and then to the South Strip Transfer Terminal (SSTT)).  Route 117 serves the road south from the SSTT past the Las Vegas Premium Outlet South store, the South Point Casino and Silverado Ranch Blvd.

History
Las Vegas Boulevard has had several names, including 5th Street (from Sahara to Owens, within the Las Vegas city limits), Main Street (in North Las Vegas), the Arrowhead Highway, Los Angeles Highway, Salt Lake Highway, US 91 (entire segment), US 93 (from Fremont Street north), US 466 (from Jean to Fremont Street, including the Las Vegas Strip) and State Route 6 (entire segment, unsigned).

South of the city, Las Vegas Boulevard was commonly known as the 'Los Angeles Highway. Just north of Jean is the place where the last spike on the San Pedro, Los Angeles, and Salt Lake Railroad line was driven.

With the construction of I-15, Las Vegas Boulevard went from being the main through road to one that only served as a city street for locals and tourists. Its current name, in effect since 1959, reflects its importance to the Valley rather than past names when it served as a main intra-city road.

On October 16, 2009, the Federal Highway Administration announced the designation of a new National Scenic Byway on the boulevard. The  section starting at Sahara Avenue and running north to Washington Avenue was designated the City of Las Vegas, Las Vegas Boulevard State Scenic Byway.

See also

 Tropicana – Las Vegas Boulevard intersection

References

External links

 Boulevards in the United States
Historic trails and roads in Nevada
National Scenic Byways
Streets in the Las Vegas Valley
Streets in Las Vegas
Streets in Henderson, Nevada
Streets in North Las Vegas, Nevada
U.S. Route 91